Mount Yushi is a  mountain in Dongyang township, Guangfeng District of Shangrao, Jiangxi, China. It is the highest mountain in the northeastern Guangfeng District. It belongs to Danxia landform. On the top of the mountain, there is a Buddhist temple named "Yushi Temple".

References

Tourist attractions in Shangrao
Geography of Shangrao
Yushi